First United Methodist Church is a historic Methodist church at 618 Wallace Avenue in Coeur d'Alene, Idaho.  It was built in 1906 and was added to the National Register in 1979.

The church was designed by Coeur d'Alene architect George Williams, and it was built mostly by volunteer labor.  It has stepped gables on its two street-facing facades, which are made of white pressed brick.  The building has two towers of different heights.

References

Methodist churches in Idaho
Churches on the National Register of Historic Places in Idaho
Churches completed in 1906
Buildings and structures in Coeur d'Alene, Idaho
National Register of Historic Places in Kootenai County, Idaho
1906 establishments in Idaho